"Darlin' Cory" (also "Darling Corey" or "Darling Cora") (Roud 5723) is a well-known American folk song about love, loss, and moonshine. It is similar in theme to "Little Maggie" and "The Gambling Man" but is not considered the same as those songs.

Early printed versions
The earliest published version of "Darlin' Corey" occurs as verses within the song "The Gambling Man", collected from oral tradition by folklorist Cecil Sharp, as sung by Mrs. Clercy Deeton, at Mine Fork, Burnsville, N.C., on Sept. 19, 1918. The text (without tune) was also published as "Little Cora" in Harvey H. Fuson's Ballads of the Kentucky Highlands (London, 1931). A version from the singing of Aunt Molly Jackson appears in the book Our Singing Country (1941) by  John A. Lomax and Alan Lomax. It is also included in Folk Song, U.S.A. by John A. and Alan Lomax, Charles Seeger and Ruth Crawford Seeger (Duell, Sloan and Pearce, 1947), pp. 310–311.

Early recordings
The first known commercial audio recording  was made by Clarence Gill as "Little Corey" on January 6, 1927, but was rejected by the record company and never released. A few months later, folk singer Buell Kazee recorded it as "Darling Cora" on April 20, 1927 (Brunswick 154). Later the same year, on July 29, 1927, at the famous Bristol Sessions an influential version was recorded by B. F. Shelton as "Darlin' Cora" (Victor 35838). Other early recordings are "Little Lulie" by Dick Justice (1929) and "Darling Corey", released as a single by the Monroe Brothers in 1936.

In 1941, The Monroe Brothers' version was included in a landmark 5-disc compilation, Smoky Mountain Ballads, produced and annotated by noted folklorist John A. Lomax  (Victor Records).  Whereas the earlier, "hillybilly" records had been marketed regionally, "Smoky Mountain Ballads" was intended for broad, urban audiences. It comprised reissues of ten comparatively recent commercially issued hillbilly recordings from the 1930s, including, in addition to the performance of "Darlin' Cory" by the Monroe Brothers, songs by the Carter Family, Uncle Dave Macon, Mainer's Mountaineers, and other Southeastern performers. Smoky Mountain Ballads became a staple in the repertoires of 1940s and early '50s folk music revival singers such as Pete Seeger, who was meticulous in crediting his sources and urged that people copy them and not him. That same year on May 28, 1941,  Burl Ives also recorded "Darlin' Cory" it in his debut album Okeh Presents the Wayfaring Stranger (issued August 1941 with liner notes by Alan Lomax).

Lyrics

Other recordings

Numerous artists have recorded versions of "Darlin' Cory", including:

Flatt and Scruggs (as "Dig A Hole In The Meadow"). on Flatt and Scruggs at Carnegie Hall, 1962
Mike Seeger
Roscoe Holcomb
John Hartford (as "Dig a Hole"), on Steam Powered Aereo-Takes, 1971
Doc Watson 
Bruce Hornsby
The Weavers
Crooked Still
Bill Monroe
Harry Belafonte (as "Darlin' Cora," attributed to Fred Brooks, a pseudonym used by Fred Hellerman),
Holly Golightly & The Brokeoffs (as "Cora")
Lonnie Donegan
Buddy Greene
Eileen Ivers
Crooked Still
Pete Seeger
Old Crow Medicine Show
The Kingston Trio, on At Large, 1959
Tao Rodríguez-Seeger (grandson of Pete Seeger)
Bill Clifton
The Seldom Scene
Chris Jones
Chuck Ragan and Austin Lucas, on  Bristle Ridge, 2008
Red Molly
Dan Levenson
Bryn Haworth, on Sunny Side of the Street, 1975
Maddox Brothers and Rose (as "Dig a Hole")
Bob Weir, as "Lay My Lily Down", on his 2016 Blue Mountain
Maxida Märak, (as "Darling Corey" with Downhill Bluegrass Band) on Mountain Songs and Other Stories, 2014
Amythyst Kiah (In her 2013 album "Dig")
Joe Brown, as "Darling Corrie"
Blood Oranges, as "Dig a Hole"

Notes

References

External links
Traditional Ballad Index at California State University, Fresno
The Deadlists Project 
Juneberry78s — B.F. Shelton — contains mp3 of Shelton's 1927 version 
Berea College Sound Archives – Darling Corrie — version of the song by banjoist Lily May Ledford, recorded live on the Renfro Valley Barn Dance in 1951

Burl Ives songs
American folk songs
Year of song unknown
Songwriter unknown
1918 songs